Okeechobee station is a Metrorail station in Hialeah, Florida. The station is located at the intersection of West 20th Street and Okeechobee Road (US 27), one block south of the Hialeah Expressway (SR 934). It opened to passenger service on May 19, 1985, and was previously the northwestern terminus of the Metrorail system until Palmetto station opened in 2003.

Station layout
The station has two tracks and an island platform, with parking underneath the tracks on either side of the station.

Places of interest
Hialeah and Hialeah Gardens
Medley
Miami Springs
Miami-Dade Warehouse District

References

External links
MDT – Metrorail Stations
 Station from Google Maps Street View

Green Line (Metrorail)
Metrorail (Miami-Dade County) stations in Miami-Dade County, Florida
Railway stations in the United States opened in 1985
1985 establishments in Florida
Transportation in Hialeah, Florida